Al-Shinyah (also spelled al-Shiniyeh) is a village in central Syria, administratively part of the Homs Governorate, located northwest of Homs. Nearby localities include Fahel to the southwest, al-Qabu to the south, Sharqliyya to the southeast, Taldou and al-Taybah al-Gharbiyah to the northeast and Maryamin to the northwest. According to the Syria Central Bureau of Statistics (CBS), al-Shinyah had a population of 2,058 in the 2004 census. Its inhabitants are predominantly Alawites.

References

Bibliography

 

Populated places in Homs District
Alawite communities in Syria